E. Ernst may refer to:
Edzard Ernst, modern-day Professor of Complementary Medicine
Emil Ernst, 20th-century German astronomer